Palatupana is a coastal village located in the Hambantota District of Southern Province, Sri Lanka.

Geography
Palatupana lies along B499 road, where that road crosses Yala National Park.

References 

Populated places in Hambantota District
Populated coastal places in Sri Lanka